21 Arietis (abbreviated 21 Ari) is a binary star system in the northern  constellation of Aries. 21 Arietis is the Flamsteed designation. It has a combined apparent visual magnitude is 5.57; the brighter member is magnitude 6.40 while the fainter star is magnitude 6.48. The pair orbit each other with a period of 23.70 years and an eccentricity of 0.68.

The system was initially thought to be a triple system in 1981, since the orbit of the system predicted a mass greater than would be expected from its F6V spectral type. This was later rejected because the distance to the system was overestimated. However, while observing the spectrum of the system, it was found that a giant planet may be causing radial velocity variations.

References

External links
 HR 657
 CCDM J02157+2503
 Image 21 Arietis

013872
Binary stars
010535
F-type main-sequence stars
Arietis, 21
Arietis, 21
Aries (constellation)
Durchmusterung objects
0657